The 2016 BB&T Atlanta Open was a professional men's tennis tournament played on hard courts. It was the 29th edition of the tournament, and part of the 2016 ATP World Tour and the 2016 US Open Series. It took place at Atlantic Station in Atlanta, United States between August 1 and August 7, 2016. It was the second men's event of the 2016 US Open Series. Second-seeded Nick Kyrgios won the singles title.

Singles main-draw entrants

Seeds 

 1 Rankings are as of July 25, 2016

Other entrants 
The following players received wildcards into the singles main draw:
  Jared Donaldson
  Reilly Opelka
  Austin Smith

The following player received entry using a protected ranking:
  Julien Benneteau

The following players received entry from the qualifying draw:
  Christopher Eubanks 
  Austin Krajicek
  John-Patrick Smith 
  Mischa Zverev

The following player received entry as lucky losers:
  Tobias Kamke
  Thiago Monteiro

Withdrawals 
Before the tournament
  Jérémy Chardy →replaced by  Dušan Lajović
  Borna Ćorić →replaced by  Horacio Zeballos 
  Kyle Edmund →replaced by  Sergiy Stakhovsky 
  Marcel Granollers →replaced by  Dan Evans  
  John Millman →replaced by  Bjorn Fratangelo
  Benoît Paire →replaced by  Igor Sijsling 
  Lucas Pouille →replaced by  Yoshihito Nishioka 
  Albert Ramos Viñolas →replaced by  replaced by Sam Groth 
  Diego Schwartzman → replaced by  Tim Smyczek

ATP doubles main-draw entrants

Seeds

1 Rankings are as of July 25, 2016

Other entrants
The following pairs received wildcards into the doubles main draw:
  Christopher Eubanks /  Zack Kennedy
  James Frawley /  Nick Kyrgios

The following pairs received entry as alternates:
  Thiago Monteiro /  Yoshihito Nishioka
  Dean O'Brien /  Ruan Roelofse

Withdrawals
Before the tournament
  Sam Groth 
  Rajeev Ram

Finals

Singles 

  Nick Kyrgios defeated  John Isner, 7–6(7–3), 7–6(7–4)

Doubles 

  Andrés Molteni /  Horacio Zeballos defeated  Johan Brunström /  Andreas Siljeström, 7–6(7–2), 6–4

References

External links 
 

BBandT Atlanta Open
Atlanta Open (tennis)